The R502 is a Regional Route in South Africa.

Route
It originates from the N12 between Potchefstroom and Stilfontein in the North West. It runs in a south-westerly direction, north of the Vaal River and roughly paralleling the N12. The first town it passes through is Orkney where it intersects with the R30. It continues through Leeudoringstad where it is briefly co-signed with the crossing R504.  The last town it passes through is Makwassie where again it is briefly co-signed with the crossing R505.  A few kilometres later the road rejoins the N12.

References

Regional Routes in North West (South African province)